Farid Elias Nazha (10 January 1894 in Hama, Syria – 19 October 1970) was an Assyrian Nationalist and a journalist. He was known for his criticism to Syriac Christian Clergy which led to his excommunication by the Syriac Orthodox Patriarch Ignatius Afram I Barsoum. He is considered one of founders of modern Assyrian nationalism.

Early life
Farid was born on 10 January 1894 to a family which traces its roots back to Kharput in modern-day Turkey. In 1911 a number of Syriac Orthodox members of his family converted to Syriac Catholicism which initiated a bitter conflict between the Assyrians of Hama. Farid's father decided to send his son to Argentina to prevent him from getting involved in the conflict.

In August 1911 he arrived in Buenos Aires, where he studied Mathematics and Economy. He got married and moved to Santiago del Estero in March 1920 where he worked there, and after 11 years he went back to Buenos Aires.

Journalism and activism
Influenced by Naum Faiq's writing, Nazha established a Syriac cultural club, the "Ephremic Society", in 1934. It included Assyrian/Syriac immigrants in Argentina. A newspaper, "Syriac University", was published by the society in September of the same year.

The newspaper was initially aimed at the Assyrian/Syriac immigrants in Argentina, but its popularity grew as Assyrian journalists from other parts of the world started contributing to it. Nazha himself had a permanent column in the newspaper and he often attacked the clergy in what he saw as "consecration of separation" of different Syriac Churches. For him nationality was above religion, and archbishops should not have a leading role in the Assyrian/Syriac society. His views about the church worsened as the latter started adopting Arabic in its liturgies. The clash with the clergy reached its peak when the Syriac Orthodox patriarch Ignatius Afram I Barsoum formally excommunicated him, although his successor Ignatius Ya`qub III retracted this decision in the late 1950s.

Farid Nazha continued publishing his newspaper until his death in Spain on 19 October 1970.

References

1894 births
1971 deaths
Argentine people of Syrian-Assyrian descent
Syrian emigrants to Argentina
Assyrian nationalists
Assyrian Syrian writers
Syriac Orthodox Christians
Turkish Oriental Orthodox Christians
Assyrians from the Ottoman Empire
Spanish people of Syrian-Assyrian descent
People from Hama